Mikheil Gachechiladze (born December 24, 1990) is a Georgian rugby union player. His position is flanker, and he currently plays for Enisei-STM in the Rugby Premier League.

Honours 
 Russian Championships (4): 2017, 2018, 2019, 2020/21
 Russian Cup (2): 2017, 2020
 Russian Supercup: 2017
 Nikolaev Cup (3): 2017, 2018, 2021
 European Rugby Continental Shield (2): 2016-17, 2017-18

References

1990 births
Living people
Rugby union players from Georgia (country)
Georgia international rugby union players
Yenisey-STM Krasnoyarsk players
Rugby union flankers
The Black Lion players